Active Sound is a sound, averaging  wide, extending in an east-northeast direction from Antarctic Sound and joining the Firth of Tay with which it separates Joinville and Dundee Islands. Discovered in 1892–93 by Captain Thomas Robertson of the Dundee whaling expedition. Robertson named the feature after his ship, the Active, first vessel to navigate the sound.

Sounds of Graham Land
Landforms of the Joinville Island group